The FAI Cup 2008 was the 88th staging of The Football Association of Ireland Challenge Cup, or FAI Cup for short. This season was the second one sponsored by Ford.

The 2008 FAI Ford Cup officially kicked off in late March, when four clubs from the Intermediate and Junior leagues battled it out in the first round for the opportunity to join 18 A Championship, Intermediate and Junior clubs in the second round.

The ten winners of those ties were joined in the Third Round by 12 Premier Division and 10 First Division clubs.

The competition ran until late November, with the final taking place on Sunday, 23 November 2008 at the RDS.

First round
Fixtures were played on the weekend of Sunday 30 March 2008.

Second round
Fixtures were played on the weekend of Sunday 20 April 2008.

1Played on April 13, 2008 as Corduff FC gave up home advantage in tie due to unavailability of side on April 20.

Third round
Matches played on the weekend of Sunday, 8 June 2008. The draw took place on Monday, 12 May 2008 and was made by Giovanni Trappatoni and Marco Tardelli, and televised live on RTÉ Two.

Fourth round
Matches played on the weekend of Sunday, 17 August 2008. The draw place on Monday, 7 July 2008 and televised live on RTÉ Two.

Quarter-finals
Matches were played on the weekend of Sunday, 14 September 2008. The draw took place on Monday, 25 August 2008 and was made by Turlough O'Connor and David Flood, and televised live on RTÉ Two.

Quarter-final replays

Semi-finals
Matches were played on the weekend of Sunday, 26 October 2008. The draw took place on Monday, 29 September 2008 and was made by John Ryan and David Flood, and televised live on RTÉ Two.

Final

The 2008 FAI Cup Final took place on Sunday 23 November 2008 at the RDS, Dublin.

References

External links
 Official website
 Results on rte.ie

 
2008
2